P. K. Vairamuthu is an Indian politician and he was member of the Tamil Nadu Legislative Assembly in 2011 from the Thirumayam constituency. He represents the Anna Dravida Munnetra Kazhagam party.

References

All India Anna Dravida Munnetra Kazhagam politicians
Living people
Year of birth missing (living people)
Tamil Nadu MLAs 2011–2016
Place of birth missing (living people)